Brandon Kyle Woodruff (born February 10, 1993) is an American professional baseball pitcher for the Milwaukee Brewers of Major League Baseball (MLB).

Career
Woodruff attended Wheeler High School in Wheeler, Mississippi and was drafted by the Texas Rangers in the fifth round of the 2011 MLB draft out of high school. He did not sign with the Rangers and attended Mississippi State University to play college baseball. In 2014, his junior season, he went 1-3 with a 6.75 ERA in 37 innings. In 2012, he played collegiate summer baseball with the Harwich Mariners of the Cape Cod Baseball League. After his junior year he was drafted by the Milwaukee Brewers in the 11th round of the 2014 MLB Draft.

Woodruff made his professional debut that year with the Helena Brewers and spent the whole season there, going 1–2 with a 3.28 ERA in 14 games (eight starts). He pitched 2015 with the Brevard County Manatees, compiling a 4–7 record and 3.45 ERA in 21 games (19 starts), and started 2016 there. In May, he was promoted to the Biloxi Shuckers. In July, his brother died following an ATV accident. In his first start since his brother's death, Woodruff threw six shutout innings allowing one hit with nine strikeouts as well as hitting a home run. Woodruff ended 2016 with a combined 14-9 record and 2.68 ERA in 28 starts between both teams.

Woodruff started the 2017 season playing with the Colorado Springs Sky Sox. The Brewers promoted Woodruff to the major leagues on June 13. However, he injured himself warming up, and was placed on the disabled list. The Brewers recalled Woodruff to make his debut on August 4. He was optioned back to Colorado Springs on August 20 and recalled once again on September 1. In eight starts for Milwaukee he was 2–3 with a 4.81 ERA, and in 16 starts for Colorado Springs he pitched to a 6-5 record and 4.30 ERA.

MLB.com ranked Woodruff as Milwaukee's third best prospect going into the 2018 season. He began 2018 with Milwaukee, but was optioned to Colorado Springs in early April.

He opened Game 1 of the NLDS against the Colorado Rockies, pitching three scoreless innings in the Brewers' eventual 3–2 win. In Game 1 of the 2018 National League Championship Series against the Los Angeles Dodgers, Woodruff hit a home run off of Clayton Kershaw. He became the 22nd pitcher and the 3rd relief pitcher in postseason history to accomplish the feat. 

In 2019, Woodruff pitched in 22 games, registering a 11-3 record and a 3.62 ERA with 143 strikeouts in  innings pitched for the Brewers. He was also named to the 2019 Major League Baseball All-Star Game. In 2020, Woodruff pitched to a 3-5 record and a 3.05 ERA with 91 strikeouts in  innings of work in a league-leading 13 starts.

On January 13, 2023, Woodruff signed a one-year, $10.8 million contract with the Brewers, avoiding salary arbitration.

Personal life
Woodruff is married to Jonie Woodruff. They have one daughter together.

References

External links

1993 births
Living people
People from Prentiss County, Mississippi
Baseball players from Mississippi
National League All-Stars
Major League Baseball pitchers
Milwaukee Brewers players
Mississippi State Bulldogs baseball players
Harwich Mariners players
Arizona League Brewers players
Helena Brewers players
Brevard County Manatees players
Biloxi Shuckers players
Colorado Springs Sky Sox players
Sportspeople from Tupelo, Mississippi
Nashville Sounds players
Wisconsin Timber Rattlers players